UFC 79: Nemesis was a mixed martial arts (MMA) event held by the Ultimate Fighting Championship (UFC), that took place on December 29, 2007, at the Mandalay Bay Events Center in Las Vegas, Nevada.

Background
The main events featured the fight between Chuck Liddell and Wanderlei Silva, as well as the rubber match between former UFC Welterweight Champions Georges St-Pierre and Matt Hughes for the interim Welterweight championship.

Additionally, Pride Light Heavyweight Rameau Thierry Sokoudjou made his UFC debut against undefeated Lyoto Machida.

The main event was originally scheduled to have The Ultimate Fighter 6 coaches Matt Serra and Matt Hughes for Serra's UFC Welterweight Championship, which Serra won at UFC 69: Shootout on April 7, 2007, in an upset victory over Georges St-Pierre.  Serra, however, withdrew from the fight due to a back injury, Serra was replaced by St-Pierre, though the fight would now be contested for the interim Welterweight Championship, with the winner facing Serra afterwards.

Results

Bonus awards
At the end of this event, $50,000 was awarded to each of the fighters who received one of these three awards.

Fight of the Night: Chuck Liddell vs. Wanderlei Silva
Knockout of the Night: Eddie Sanchez
Submission of the Night: Georges St-Pierre

See also
 Ultimate Fighting Championship
 List of UFC champions
 List of UFC events
 2007 in UFC

References

External links
 UFC 79 fight card
 Official UFC 79 website

Ultimate Fighting Championship events
2007 in mixed martial arts
Mixed martial arts in Las Vegas
2007 in sports in Nevada